Fisherman's Friends is a 2019 British comedy-drama film directed by Chris Foggin from a screenplay by Nick Moorcroft, Meg Leonard and Piers Ashworth.

The film is based on a true story about Fisherman's Friends, a group of Cornish fishermen from Port Isaac who were signed by Universal Records and achieved a top 10 hit with their debut album of traditional sea shanties.

The film stars Daniel Mays, James Purefoy, David Hayman, Dave Johns, Sam Swainsbury, Tuppence Middleton, Noel Clarke, Christian Brassington, Maggie Steed and Jade Anouka.

Plot
A fast living, cynical London music executive, Danny, reluctantly heads to Cornwall on his colleague Henry's stag weekend, where he's pranked by his boss, Troy, into trying to sign a group of shanty-singing fishermen. Danny becomes the ultimate ‘fish out of water’, struggling to gain the respect and enthusiasm of the unlikely boy band that consists of Jim, Jago, Leadville and Rowan, who all value friendship and community over fame and fortune. Attempting to overcome the fishermen's scepticism about the music business, Danny finds himself drawn into the community, has his integrity tested and ultimately is shown the meaning of loyalty, love and friendship. This forces Danny to re-evaluate what really matters in life, ultimately giving him the chance of a different kind of success which leads to him falling in love with Jim's daughter, Alwyn.

Cast in contractual order
 Daniel Mays as Danny
 James Purefoy as Jim
 David Hayman as Jago
 Dave Johns as Leadville
 Sam Swainsbury as Rowan
 Tuppence Middleton as Alwyn
 Noel Clarke as Troy
 Christian Brassington as Henry
 Maggie Steed as Maggie
 Vahid Gold as Driss
 Jo Hart as Journalist
 Julian Seager as Trieve
 Christopher Villiers as Charles Montague
 Charlotte Baker as Abigail
 Meadow Nobrega as Tamsyn
 Jade Anouka as Leah
 Ashley Bannerman as Nurse

Two-Michelin-starred Port Isaac chef Nathan Outlaw has a cameo role as a man who has unwisely parked his car where the tide can swamp it.

Production

Filming

Filming commenced on 30 April 2018 on location in Port Isaac, Cornwall, and London for five weeks. All members of the band have cameos in the film and worked as consultants on the film.

Reception

Box office
The film was released on 503 screens on 15 March 2019 in the United Kingdom and debuted at #2 in the UK Box office chart, grossing $1,534,908 in its opening weekend behind global box office phenomenon Captain Marvel. The film was #3 in its second weekend taking $1,285,332. The film was #4 in its third weekend taking $820,293. As of Friday 10 May 2020, the film had grossed $11,553,041.

Controversy

Noel Clarke, a Black British actor, was credited on the UK poster but his image was not featured. Writing on Twitter, Clarke said "not one of these other actors spoke up for me when I was left off the poster".
However, Clarke was, at that time, the subject of allegations of bullying and sexual harassment.

Soundtrack
Island Records released the film's original soundtrack titled Keep Hauling - Music From The Movie on 15 March 2019.

Track listing:
	Keep Hauling
	Nelson's Blood
	John Kanaka
	The Cost of High Barbary
	South Australia
	Little Liz I Love You
	Widow Woman
	Le Capitaine de San Malo
	Blow the Man Down
	Shanty Man
	Oh You New York Girls
	The 'Trelawny' National Anthem
	The Leaving Shanty
	No Hopers, Jokers & Rogues
	Fisherman's Blues
	(What Shall We Do with the) Drunken Sailor
 Union of Different Kinds

Stage musical adaptation 

A stage musical called Fisherman's Friends: The Musical, based on the band's true story and the 2019 film, made its world premiere at the Hall for Cornwall in Truro in October 2021, written by Brad Birch and directed by James Grieve.

Sequel
A sequel, about the band singing at Glastonbury, was released on 19 August 2022. The film is called Fisherman's Friends: One and All.

References

External links
 
 

2019 films
2019 comedy-drama films
British comedy-drama films
2010s English-language films
Films set in Cornwall
2010s British films